Ibrahim Olanrewaju Obayomi (born 9 September 1992) is a Nigerian football player who plays for Marítimo B.

Club career
He made his Primeira Liga debut for Marítimo on 21 August 2011 as a second-half substitute in a 0–2 loss to Braga.

References

1992 births
Sportspeople from Lagos
Living people
Nigerian footballers
Crown F.C. players
C.S. Marítimo players
Nigerian expatriate footballers
Expatriate footballers in Portugal
Primeira Liga players
Liga Portugal 2 players
Association football forwards